The 2012 European Pool Championships   was a professional pool tournament held 21–31 March 2012 in Alvisse Parc Hotel in Luxembourg City hosted by the European Pocket Billiard Federation (EPBF). The disciplines were played eight-ball, nine-ball, ten-ball and straight pool in the categories Men's, Ladies and wheelchairs.  The wheelchair users played for the titles only in 8-ball, 9-ball and 10-ball. 
The most successful player was the Finnish wheelchair user Jouni Tähti who won two events, the Spaniard Francisco Díaz-Pizarro and the Austrian Mario He each won event and reached a semi-final in another once.

Format 
The event was first played in all categories in a double-elimination tournament followed by a single-elimination tournament from the quarter-final onwards.

Winners

Men's 
The events from the quarter finals are shown below.

8-Ball

9-Ball

10-Ball

Straight pool

Women's 
The events from the quarter finals are shown below.

8-Ball

9-Ball

10-Ball

Straight pool

Wheelchair event 
The events from the quarter finals are shown below.

8-Ball

9-Ball

10-Ball

Team event 
The team competitions initially took place in a double elimination event. From the quarter-finals (men) or from the semifinals (ladies) was played in a single elimination format. One team consisted of three players. A game consisted of three individual games in the disciplines 8-ball, 9-ball and 10-ball. In the women's team, two players were in each team, one game consisted of two individual games in 8-ball and 9-Ball. 

The events from the quarter finals are shown below.

Men

Women

Medals' table

References

External links 
 

2012 in cue sports
2012 in Luxembourgian sport
International sports competitions hosted by Luxembourg
European Pool Championships